Leendert "Leen" van der Meulen (22 November 1937 – 2 September 2015) was a cyclist from the Netherlands. After winning the 1961 UCI Motor-paced World Championships in the amateurs category he turned professional and finished in second place at the national championships in 1962.

References

1937 births
2015 deaths
Dutch male cyclists
People from Haarlemmermeer
Cyclists from North Holland